Chemung County is a county in the southern tier of the U.S. state of New York. The population was 84,148 as of the 2020 census. Its county seat is Elmira. Its name is derived from a Delaware Indian village whose name meant "big horn".

Chemung County comprises the Elmira, NY Metropolitan Statistical Area, which is also included in the Elmira-Corning, NY Combined Statistical Area.

Many signs posted along roads in Chemung County refer to the area as "Mark Twain Country," because the noted author lived and wrote for many years in Elmira.

History

In the late 1870s, the Greenback Party became prominent in Chemung and nearby counties in western New York. Here it was primarily allied with labor in a critique of capital, reaching its peak in 1878, the year following the Great Railroad Strike of 1877 and the Scranton General Strike in Pennsylvania. There were also strikes that year in Albany, Syracuse and Buffalo, starting with the railroad workers. In Steuben and Chemung counties, Greenbackers were elected to county councils in 1878 instead of Democrats, and others were elected from there and nearby counties to the state legislature, gaining votes of more than 25 percent in several of the Southern Tier counties. It gradually declined after that, due to internal dissension and the strength of the two major parties.

Geography

Chemung County is in the southwestern part of New York State, along the Pennsylvania border, in a part of New York called the Southern Tier and is also part of the Finger Lakes Region.

The Southern Tier Expressway runs through the County east-west near the Pennsylvania border, between Waverly, New York and Corning, New York via Elmira, New York.

Transportation

Major highways

   Interstate 86 / New York State Route 17 (Southern Tier Expressway)
  New York State Route 13
  New York State Route 14
  New York State Route 34
  New York State Route 223
  New York State Route 328
  New York State Route 352
  New York State Route 367
  New York State Route 414
  New York State Route 427

Airport
 Elmira Corning Regional Airport

Demographics

2020 Census

2000 Census 
As of the 2000 census, there were 91,070 people, 35,049 households and 23,272 families residing in the county. The population density was 223 per square mile (86/km2). There were 37,745 housing units at an average density of 92 per square mile (36/km2). The racial makeup of the county was 90.96% White, 5.82% Black or African American, 0.23% Native American, 0.78% Asian, 0.02% Pacific Islander, 0.75% from other races, and 1.44% from two or more races. 1.77% of the population were Hispanic or Latino of any race. 16.4% were of German, 15.7% Irish, 12.5% English, 11.8% Italian, 7.8% American and 6.3% Polish ancestry according to Census 2000 . Most of those claiming to be of "American" ancestry are of English descent and, in upstate New York, also in some cases of Dutch descent, but have family that has been in the country for so long, in many cases since the early seventeenth century, that they choose to identify simply as "American". 96.2% spoke English and 1.6% Spanish as their first language.

There were 35,049 households, of which 31.00% had children under the age of 18 living with them, 49.80% were married couples living together, 12.40% had a female householder with no husband present, and 33.60% were non-families. 27.90% of all households were made up of individuals, and 12.20% had someone living alone who was 65 years of age or older. The average household size was 2.44 and the average family size was 2.97.

Age distribution was 24.40% under the age of 18, 8.80% from 18 to 24, 28.30% from 25 to 44, 22.90% from 45 to 64, and 15.60% who were 65 years of age or older. The median age was 38 years. For every 100 females there were 97.70 males. For every 100 females age 18 and over, there were 95.30 males.

The median household income was $36,415, and the median family income was $43,994. Males had a median income of $35,076 versus $24,215 for females. The per capita income for the county was $18,264. About 9.10% of families and 13.00% of the population were below the poverty line, including 18.40% of those under age 18 and 6.80% of those age 65 or over.

Government

Before 1974, Chemung County was governed by a board of supervisors. On January 1, 1974, executive and legislative powers were split between a county executive and a 15-seat legislature. All 15 members are elected from single-member districts. Chemung County is a part of the 23rd congressional district, represented by Republican Nick Langworthy.

Politics

|}

In presidential elections, Chemung County tends to vote Republican. It voted for George W. Bush in 2004 by a 10.85% margin. In 2008, the margin was much closer, but voters still gave John McCain a 1.23% win over Barack Obama. In 2012, Mitt Romney carried the county by 2.33%. In 2016, Donald Trump carried Chemung County with 55.64% of the vote compared to Hillary Clinton's 38.09%. Trump carried the county again in 2020 with over 55% of the vote.

Education

Education in Chemung County is provided by various private and public institutions. High school students and adults have access to GST BOCES. BOCES provides vocation-style training in a wide range of fields as well as adult education.

Public school districts
 Horseheads Central School District
 Elmira City School District
 Elmira Heights Central School District

Private schools
 Chemung Valley Montessori School
 Elmira Christian Academy
 Holy Family Middle School
 Saint Mary Our Mother School
 Notre Dame High School
 Twin Tiers Christian Academy

Higher education
 Arnot Ogden School of Nursing
 Corning Community College (off-campus sites)
 Elmira College
 Elmira Business Institute

Public libraries
Chemung County Library District

 Steele Memorial Library
 Horseheads Free Library
 Big Flats Library
 West Elmira Library
 Van Etten Library
 Chemung County Bookmobile

Communities

Larger Settlements

† - County Seat

†† - Former Village

Towns

 Ashland
 Baldwin
 Big Flats
 Catlin
 Chemung
 Elmira
 Erin
 Horseheads
 Southport
 Van Etten
 Veteran

Hamlet
 Lowman

Notable people

See also

 List of counties in New York
 National Register of Historic Places listings in Chemung County, New York

References
Specific

General
 New York: Atlas of Historical County Boundaries; Compiled by Kathryn Ford Thorne and Edited by John H. Long.

Further reading

External links

  Chemung County, New York site
 Chemung County Chamber of Commerce
  Elmira College
 Chemung County Library District
 
 Matthias Hollenback, Revolutionary War soldier, merchant in early Elmira, judge 

 
1836 establishments in New York (state)
Populated places established in 1836
Counties of Appalachia
New York placenames of Native American origin